The name Emma has been used for thirteen tropical cyclones and for two extratropical cyclones worldwide. Of the tropical systems, nine were in the West Pacific Ocean, three were in the Southern Indian Ocean, and one was in the South-West Indian Ocean. The two extratropical systems were both European windstorms.

In the Western Pacific Ocean:

Typhoon Emma (1952) (T5203)
Typhoon Emma (1956) (T5612) – Category 4 typhoon that affected Okinawa and South Korea, killing 77.
Typhoon Emma (1959) (T5920, 46W) 
Typhoon Emma (1962) (T6222, 73W) – damage in Guam and Saipan totaled out to $250,000.
Tropical Storm Emma (1965) (T6510, 12W, Ibiang)
Typhoon Emma (1967) (T6735, 37W, Welming)
Tropical Storm Emma (1971) (T7109, 09W, Ising)
Tropical Storm Emma (1974) (T7406, 07W, Klaring)
Tropical Storm Emma (1977) (T7711, 13W)

In the Southern Indian Ocean:

 Cyclone Emma (1984)
 Cyclone Emma (1995)
 Cyclone Emma (2006)

In the South-West Indian Ocean:

 Cyclone Emma (1963)

In Europe:

 Cyclone Emma (2008), passed through Central Europe
 Storm Emma (2018), brought heavy snow falls

See also

 Tropical Storm Ema, a similar name which has been used in the Central Pacific.

Pacific typhoon set index articles
South-West Indian Ocean cyclone set index articles
Australian region cyclone set index articles